"Resistance Is Futile" is the ninth episode of the second season and twenty-first overall episode of the American television drama series Dexter, which first aired on 25 November 2007 on Showtime in the United States. The episode was written by Melissa Rosenberg and was directed by Marcos Siega.

Title
The phrase is a common Sci-fi quote, prevalent in popular culture. It was frequently used by the Borg of the Star Trek franchise.

Plot

Under constant surveillance by federal agents, Dexter is unable to dispose of his latest victim's remains. He apologizes to Rita, admitting that his affair with Lila was a mistake, but she is still hesitant to forgive him, as Lila retaliates by pursuing Angel. After finding Dexter's collection of blood slides, Doakes seeks the advice of an old friend in Haiti to analyze them. The department begins to suspect Doakes's involvement in the Bay Harbor Butcher case, but cannot find him for questions. Debra and Lundy spend the night together and contemplate making their relationship public. Dexter is eventually caught by Doakes with the remains of Jiminez, the man who killed his mother. Doakes attempts to arrest Dexter but Dexter manages to choke him unconscious despite taking a bullet in the leg. He locks Doakes in Jiminez's house and leaves as Doakes screams that Dexter will have to kill him to stop his pursuit.

Production
Filming locations for the episode included Palos Verdes Estates, and Long Beach, California.

Reception

The episode was positively received. IGN's Eric Goldman gave the episode a rating of 9.5 out of 10, and commented "Wow. Dexter's second season has just gotten better and better and this week's episode was a true jaw-dropper, moving the plot along at an incredibly fast rate. [...] This is truly an excellent and nailbiting scenario the writers have crafted, leaving the show in a wonderfully suspenseful situation. In fact, it was so thrilling, it felt like the penultimate episode of the season, and it's hard to believe there's still three more weeks left. Either way, the show has certainly proved it can continue to grab the audience and I'm sure I'm not alone by far when I say I can't wait to see what happens next." The A.V. Club critic Scott Tobias gave the episode a B+ grade and stated that "I'm having trouble figuring out what to write about the episode because so much of it involved the gears of the plot doing a lot of grinding, while leaving Dexter's characterization on the back burner. And yet I still found it a riveting hour, partly because the thriller mechanics were mostly very satisfying and partly because the writers found ways to make them illuminate character. In his distress and scramble to tie up numerous incriminating loose ends, Dexter is still telling us a lot about who he is."

References

External links

 
 "Resistance Is Futile" at Showtime's website

2007 American television episodes
Dexter (TV series) episodes
Television episodes directed by Marcos Siega